The Lysippides Painter was an Attic vase painter in the black-figure style. He was active around 530 to 510 BC. His conventional name comes from a kalos inscription on a vase in the British Museum attributed to him; his real name is not known.

Life and work 
His conventional name is derived from a kalos inscription on a neck amphora in the British Museum (B 211). He is considered the most significant pupil of Exekias, from whom he adopted not only his artistic style but also some important motifs, such as Ajax and Achilleus playing a board game. He also frequently painted scenes involving the hero Herakles. In total, about 30 known vases are ascribed to him.

His collaboration with the Andokides Painter, usually considered the inventor of red-figure vase painting, is unusual. On seven bilingual vases, six belly amphorae and a cup (now in Palermo), he painted the red-figure side, while the Andokides Painter was responsible for the black-figure one.  At times, the subjects painted by both are identical.  It remains disputed amongst scholars whether both painters are identical and merely represent one artist using both techniques. Already John Beazley saw them as separate artists, an argument later developed by Beth Cohen and Heide Mommsen. The identity of the two painters is supported by Konrad Schauenburg, Herbert Marwitz and John Boardman. Martin Robinson and others remained undecided.

Style 
The Lysippides Painter's works consisted of many neck-amphorae that were based on the works of Exekias, his mentor. Lysippides' works however, were simplified compared to those of Exekias. This style actually became very popular in the Archaic Period. Especially showing in the late 6th century and early 5th as his neck-amphorae stand on the front lines of a series of vases. Many of his works were extremely similar to Exekias. A vase in Detroit depicts the mythical Greek hero, Herakles wrestling a lion. This depiction takes after a neck-amphorae version done by Exekias in multiple ways. While there is no saying that Lysippides is the painter, the vase is grouped with his work stylistically in the way it takes after Exekias and that the work narrows all the attention on Herakles' role in the battle rather than the lion's. These elements are strongly associated with the work of the Lysippides Painter. Like most artists during this time, his work contained many religious references of Greek gods and goddesses in his work. Herakles being one of the more popular. 

Of the 204 vases attributed to the Lysippides Painter in the Beazley Archive, there are over 60 of Herakles in various forms of heroism, fighting the lion, mounting chariots with Athena, fighting Amazons (Amazonomachy), and fighting giants (Giantomachy). He is almost always shown in his lion cape, with hood resting on the back of his black hair, defined with white paint. The arms of the lion are tied around his chest (where muscles are also well defined with white lines). 

Of the 204 vases attributed to Lysippides P in the Beazley archives, 112 are large amphorae.  These contain all variations of Amphorae, Amphora A, Amphora B, Amphora Neck, and 4 Panathenaic Amphorae. There are also 32 cups consisting of Cup A and Little Master Band Variations.  The basins of many of these large cups are decorated with the face of a gorgonian. These Gorgonians are typical of the Nikostenes workshop to which, it has been argued, Lysippides was occasionally lent. Some of the other shapes that Lysippides works with are Krater, Columns, Oinchoes, Psykters, and Pyxis. These shapes have very small numbers, but many of them carry the same subjects as those of other Lysippides vases.

Works 
Most of the Lysippides Painter's vases appear to have been traded to Italy, especially the area around Rome, Etruria.  Of the 85 vases that have listed provenances, 74 were shipped to Italy and over of 50 of these to the Etruria region.  The other provenances include Sicily, Egypt and Turkey, but they appear in nominal numbers.

bilingual belly amphorae, painted in collaboration with the Andokides Painter 
Bologna, Museo Civico Archeologico
bilingual belly amphora 151
Front: Dionysos between maenad and satyrs, back: Herakles and the Nemean Lion
Boston, Museum of Fine Arts 
bilingual belly amphora 99.538
Front and back: Herakles and the Cretan bull
bilingual belly amphora 01.8037
Front and back: Achilles and Ajax playing a board game
London, British Museum
bilingual belly amphora B 193
Front: Herakles and the Neman Lion between Athena and Iolaos, back: Ajax and Achilles playing a board game
Munich, Staatliche Antikensammlungen
bilingual belly amphora 2301
Front and back: Herakles at the symposion
Paris, Louvre
bilingual belly amphora F 204
Front: Herakles and Kerberos, back: Dionysos with kantharos between maenad and satyrs

other works (selection) 
Bonn, Akademisches Kunstmuseum
belly amphora 62b
Cambridge, Fitzwilliam Museum
eye-cup GR 12.1937
Front: Dionysos with Kantharos between two satyrs, back: Herakles and Kyknos, interior: gorgoneion
London, British Museum
neck amphora B 211
eye-cup B 426
oinochoe B 492
Malibu, J. Paul Getty Museum
psykter 96.AE.94
'Moscow, Pushkin Museumbelly amphora II 1 B 70Munich, Staatliche Antikensammlungenneck amphora 1478
neck amphora 1575
eye-cup 2080
Front:  Herakles and Apollo fighting over a tripod, back: Herakles and the Nemean lion, Interior: gorgoneionOxford, Ashmolean Museumneck amphora 208
belly mphora 1965.100 (formerly Northwick, Spencer-Churchill collection)Palermo, Museo Archeologico Regionalebilingual eye-cup V 650 (2051)
warriors and archers (signed by the potter Andokides)Paris, Louvrehydria F 294
Athena mounting a chariot in the presence of Herakles, Dionysos, Apollon and Hermes (potter probably Andokides)Pregny, Baron E. de Rothschildbelly amphoraRome, Museo Nazionale Etrusco di Villa Giuliabelly amphora 24998Zurich, University'neck amphora ETH 7

 Bibliography 
 John Beazley: Attic Black-figure Vase-painters. Oxford 1956, p. 253-257 (p. 257-265: Style of the Lysippides Painter).
 Herbert Marwitz: Zur Einheit des Andokidesmalers, in: Jahreshefte des Österreichischen Archäologischen Institutes 46, 1961–63, p. 73-104.
 Elfriede R. Knauer: Die Berliner Andokides-Vase, Werkmonographien zur Bildenden Kunst in Reclams Universal-Bibliothek 103, Stuttgart 1965
 John Beazley: Paralipomena. Additions to Attic black-figure vase-painters and to Attic red-figure vase-painters, Oxford 1971, p. 113-116.
 John Boardman: Schwarzfigurige Vasen aus Athen. Ein Handbuch, von Zabern, Mainz 1977 (Kulturgeschichte der Antiken Welt, Vol 1) , p.
 Beth Cohen: Attic Bilingual Vases and their Painters, New York 1978 
 Martin Robertson: The art of vase-painting in classical Athens, Cambridge 1992, p. 9-14.
 Heide Mommsen: Lysippides-Maler, in: Der Neue Pauly Vol. 7, 1999, Col. 610.
 Marianne Pécasse: Recherches sur l'atelier d'Andokidès: transmission de modèles et circulation d'artisans, Dissertation Université Panthéon-Sorbonne Paris 2001
 Beth Cohen: Bilingual Vases and Vase-Painters, in: ibid.: The Colours of Clay. Special Techniques in Athenian Vases, Los Angeles 2006, p. 18-25.
 John Beazley, The Development of Attic Black-figure, Volume 24. California: University of California Press, 1951
 Madigan and Brian Christopher, Corinthian and Attic Vases in the Detroit Institute of Arts: Geometric, Black-figure, and Red-figure.'' Monumenta Graeca Et Romana: Print/Save 100 pages, 2008

Notes

External links 
 
 Getty-Museum

Ancient Greek vase painters
Anonymous artists of antiquity